Enovis (formerly Colfax Corporation) is a medical technology company, with a particular focus in orthopedics. 

Headquartered in Wilmington, Delaware, the company is listed on the NYSE as ENOV. The company has over 5,000 employees operating at 12 sites around the world.

The Company has two reported segments: Reconstructive (Recon) and Prevention and Recovery (P&R).

History 

Enovis was created in April 2022 when Colfax Corporation spun-off its industrial business, ESAB Corporation, and renamed itself Enovis to reflect the focus in the medical technology space. The spin-off was the final action taken to transform the portfolio of businesses from purely industrial to medical technologies. These actions included divesting the fluid handling and air and gas handling businesses in 2017 and 2019, respectively, and acquiring DJO Global in 2019.

Colfax was originally founded in 1995 by brothers Steven and Mitchell Rales. who had previously founded Danaher Corporation. In August 1997, Colfax Corporation acquired approximately 93% of IMO's common stock through a public tender offer. At the time of the acquisition, IMO was a diversified industrial manufacturer, with $469.0 million in annual revenue and five business units: Boston Gear, IMO Pump, Morse Controls, Gems Sensors, and Roltra Morse. Simultaneously with the closing of the tender offer, IMO divested its Gems Sensors and Roltra Morse units to narrow the strategic focus to power transmission and fluid handling.

In July 1998 the German-based Allweiler was purchased to enhance the position in the Fluid Handling segment. In February 2005 the Power Transmission group was divested. At that time the Company’s leadership was based in Richmond, Virginia.

Additional acquisitions were made, and Colfax went public with an initial public offering in May 2008 as a fluid handling company. The headquarters were subsequently moved to Annapolis Junction, Maryland. 

In January 2012, Colfax completed the acquisition of Charter International, the UK-listed parent company of ESAB (welding and cutting) and Howden (air and gas handling products), for $2.4 Billion. More than 25 acquisitions were completed from 2012–2019 to build-out the three industrial businesses, fluid handling, fabrication technologies (ESAB), and air & gas handling (Howden).

In December 2017, Colfax sold its original fluid handling platform to Circor International for cash and stock with a total estimated aggregate consideration of $860 million. In November 2018, Colfax expanded into the medical device space by acquiring DJO Global from The Blackstone Group for $3.15 billion. 

KPS Capital Partners (KPS) announced on May 16, 2019, that it has signed a definitive agreement to acquire Howden Turbo, from Colfax Corporation for $1.80 billion, including $1.66 billion in cash consideration and $0.14 billion in assumed liabilities and minority interest, subject to customary closing adjustments.

In March 2021, Colfax announced that it would spin-off its ESAB industrial business in a tax-efficient manner and pursue a focused medical technologies strategy. This spin-off was completed in April 2022, following which ESAB became an independent public company and Colfax renamed itself Enovis Corporation.

References

External links
 

Companies listed on the New York Stock Exchange
Howard County, Maryland
Manufacturing companies based in Maryland
Manufacturing companies established in 1995
1995 establishments in Maryland
American companies established in 1995